Rudolf Steiner House is a Grade 2 listed building near Regent's Park, London, which is the home of the Anthroposophical Society of Great Britain. It is a cultural hub and contains a library, bookshop, cafe, 220-seat theatre, and a therapy and wellness centre. The house operates talks and workshops on philosopher Rudolf Steiner's teachings, as well as art events.

The building was designed by Montague Wheeler (1874-1937) in the "expressionist" style, and was constructed in stages between 1926 and 1937.

Theatre productions
Romeo & Juliet, Perform International, dir. by Sarah Kane, May / June / August 2016
The Tempest, Perform International, dir. by Geoffrey Norris, April / May 2016
Shakespeare Festival, April 2016
Easter Festival, March 2016
Eurythmy Festival, March 2016
The Guardian of the Threshold by Rudolf Steiner, dir. by Richard Ramsbotham, February 2015
Wine, Sonnets and Songs, Perform International / Victoria Jane Appleton / Manish Srivastava / Aisha Kent, 14 February 2016
Gala Concert of Laureates, 2nd All Britain Youth Festival-Contest of Performing Arts, May 2015

References

External links
 Official website

Theatres in London
Grade II listed buildings in the City of Westminster